Browns Bay or Brown's Bay may refer to
 Browns Bay (South Orkney Islands), Antarctica
 Browns Bay, New Zealand
 Browns Bay, Northern Ireland, United Kingdom